, or , is a national university located in Wakayama, Japan. It was founded in 1949 and is organized in four faculties.

Organization
The university is divided into the following four faculties.
Faculty of Education & Graduate School of Education 
Faculty of Economics & Graduate School of Economics 
Faculty of Systems Engineering & Graduate School of Systems Engineering 
Faculty of Tourism

History
Wakayama University was established in May 1949 as a new style of university with a goal and mission of "undertaking research and education in highly specialized academic fields based on a broad range of knowledge, mainly in academia and culture, in accordance with the spirit of the Fundamental Law of Education and the School Education Law, in order to foster individuals who will contribute to society."

The University was created through the integration of three educational institutions, each of which had its own long history and traditions: Wakayama Normal School (Men's Division and Women's Division), Wakayama Normal School for Youth, and Wakayama Technical School of Economics. In the beginning, there were two faculties - the Faculty of Liberal Arts (currently the Faculty of Education), and the Faculty of Economics. In October 1995, the new Faculty of Systems Engineering was established.

See also
 Wakayamadaigakumae Station, the station on the Nankai Main Line nearest to the university

References

External links
 

Japanese national universities
Universities and colleges in Wakayama Prefecture
Kansai Collegiate American Football League

Educational institutions established in 1949
1949 establishments in Japan